1981 McGill College, also known as The Richter Tower, is an , 20-storey office complex in Montreal, Quebec, Canada.
The building was designed by WZMH Architects. It is located on McGill College Avenue at the intersection of De Maisonneuve Boulevard, in the Ville-Marie borough of Downtown Montreal.

1981 McGill College is currently owned and managed by Canadian insurance company Industrial Alliance. It consists of 96,380 square feet of office space.

Tenants
BNP Paribas
Epic Games
Fiera Capital
Mercer (consulting firm)
Richter LLP
State Street Corporation

See also
 List of tallest buildings in Montreal

References

Skyscrapers in Montreal
Office buildings completed in 1982
Skyscraper office buildings in Canada
Downtown Montreal
Modernist architecture in Canada
1982 establishments in Quebec

WZMH Architects buildings